Kathleen May Fowler,  ( 1925 – 17 November 2012) was an Australian military officer. She served as director of the Women's Royal Australian Army Corps and was appointed a Member of the Order of Australia in 1975. She is credited with introducing maternity leave in the Australian army service.

References

1920s births
2012 deaths
Australian Army personnel of World War II
Members of the Order of Australia
Australian colonels